Robert Thorp (1736 – 20 April 1812) was a British clergyman.

He attended Durham School and Peterhouse, Cambridge University, obtaining a B.A. in 1758 as senior wrangler and an M.A. in 1761.  In 1768 he succeeded his father Thomas Thorp (1699–1767) as rector of Chillingham; in 1782 he became rector of Gateshead; in 1792 he became archdeacon of Northumberland.  In 1795, he became rector of Ryton, and he is buried in the vault of the church there.

His youngest son Charles Thorp also became rector of Ryton and was a founder of Durham University.

Another son, George Thorp, became first lieutenant of the frigate  soon after turning 19 years-of-age and was killed six months later alongside his captain, Richard Bowen, during the assault on Santa Cruz, Tenerife, led by Nelson, on 25 July 1797.

He was author of Excerpta quædam e Newtoni Principiis Philosophiæ Naturalis, 1765 and translated Newton's Principia.

References

External links
 
 

1736 births
1812 deaths
Senior Wranglers
People educated at Durham School
Alumni of Peterhouse, Cambridge
Archdeacons of Northumberland